Joseph Singleton was the first superintendent of the Dahlonega Mint. President Andrew Jackson nominated him for the position on December 19, 1836, which was approved by the United States Senate Committee on Finance.  He became superintendent in 1838 and remained in the position until 1841.

References

Mints of the United States